is a Japanese former freestyle swimmer. She competed in three events at the 1952 Summer Olympics.

References

External links
 

1932 births
Living people
Japanese female freestyle swimmers
Olympic swimmers of Japan
Swimmers at the 1952 Summer Olympics
Place of birth missing (living people)
Asian Games medalists in swimming
Asian Games gold medalists for Japan
Swimmers at the 1954 Asian Games
Medalists at the 1954 Asian Games